Three Girls is a painting by Amrita Sher-Gil, an Indian artist. It was painted 1935; the first work to be painted by Sher-Gil after returning to India from Europe in 1934. Sometimes referred to as Group of Three Girls, the painting won the Gold Medal at the annual exhibition of the Bombay Art Society in 1937.  The painting was part of a batch sent to Nawab Salar Jang of Hyderabad who later rejected them all.

Overview 
The painting shows three colourfully dressed women contemplating a destiny they are unable to change. Amrita Sher-Gil did not sensualise her women but instead portrayed them as facing great adversity yet having the spirit to transcend a destiny that they were unable to change.    

Sher-Gil wrote:

The painting reflects the influence of the works of French painter Paul Gauguin on Sher-Gil's work. It also marks Sher-Gil's move from an earlier academic and realist style of painting that she had learned in Paris towards a flatter style with modern compositions, where line and colour are prominently used. In Three Girls, the girls' surrounding is not shown. Their situation is made evident through their facial expressions, their body language, and the skillful use of tones.

References

Paintings by Amrita Sher-Gil
1935 paintings
Paintings in India